The Taifa of Albarracín was a medieval Berber taifa kingdom. The polity existed from 1012 to 1104, and was centered at the city of Albarracín. It was led by the Berber dynasty of the Banu Razin tribe, which arrived in the peninsula after the conquest of Spain by Tariq ibn Ziyad.

Downfall
In 1167, under the pressure from the ongoing wars between the Almoravids and the new invasions by the Almohad Caliphate. The Moorish King Muhammad ibn Mardanis ceded the Taifa of Albarracín to a vassal of Sancho VI of Navarre, a noble from Estella-Lizarra named Pero Ruíz d'Azagra. The title was granted to d'Azagra due to his support of the Navarrese Crown against Alfonso VIII of Castile and Alfonso I of Aragón (Alfonso the Battler).

In 1172, Pero Ruíz d'Azagra managed to consolidate his power over the Señorío making that territory independent of the other Christian kingdoms in the region. In 1190, with the signing of the Borja Accords, between Alfonso II of Aragon and Sancho VI of Navarre, the two monarchs agreed to a defensive pact against Alfonso VIII of Castile which gave official legitimacy to the Sinyoría d'Albarrazín with respect to the two kingdoms.

List of Emirs

Banu Razin
Hudayl Djalaf 'Izz ad-Dawla: 1012–1045
Abu Marwan 'Abd al-Malik: 1045–1103
Yahya Husam ad-Dawla: 1103–1104

See also
 List of Sunni Muslim dynasties

References

Albarracin
Berber dynasties
History of Aragon
States and territories established in 1012
1012 establishments in Europe
States and territories disestablished in 1104
1104 disestablishments in Europe
Albarracin
11th-century establishments in Al-Andalus
12th-century disestablishments in Al-Andalus